Matilde Irene Pacheco Stewart (September 20, 1854 – February 13, 1926) was the First Lady of Uruguay at the beginning of the 20th century.

Biography 
Daughter of Manuel Pacheco y Obes (1813–1869), a brother of Melchor Pacheco y Obes; her mother, Anne Stewart Agell, was a sister of Duncan Stewart.

Matilde Pacheco married Ruperto Michaelsson Batlle (a nephew of Lorenzo Batlle y Grau) in 1872, with whom she had five children: Matilde, Ruperto, Juan Luis, Guillermo, and Carlos Michaelsson Pacheco. Afterwards she married in 1894 with a cousin of her first husband, José Batlle y Ordóñez, with whom she also had five children: César (1885); Rafael (1887); Amalia Ana (1892); Ana Amalia (1894); and Lorenzo (1897).

Bibliography 
 Mercedes Vigil: Matilde, la mujer de Batlle. Planeta, 2005,

References 

1854 births
1926 deaths
People from Montevideo
Uruguayan people of Spanish descent
Uruguayan people of Scottish descent
First Ladies of Uruguay